The 1976 King's Cup finals were held from 15 December to 25 December 1976, in Bangkok. This edition once again reverted to two groups of 3 teams. The winners and runners up advance.

Thailand entered this edition with an 'A' and 'B' squads.

The Groups
Two groups of three teams.
Winners and runner up qualifies for the semi-finals.

Fixtures and results

Group A

Group B

Semi-finals

3rd-place match

Final

''Title shared

Winner

External links
RSSSF

King's Cup
Kings Cup, 1976
Kings Cup, 1976
International association football competitions hosted by Thailand